Annaloughlan Halt was a railway halt which served Annaloughan in County Louth, Ireland.

History

The halt was on the Dundalk, Newry and Greenore Railway line. From 1873 to 1951 the line served the ferry service between Greenore and Holyhead. The London and North Western Railway constructed a substantial hotel and railway station at Greenore to serve passengers using the ferry.

Transferred to the London, Midland and Scottish Railway during the Grouping of 1923, the station then passed on to the Ulster Transport Authority. The station closed in 1951.

References

 
 

Disused railway stations in County Louth
Railway stations opened in 1935
Railway stations closed in 1951